New Buffalo is an unincorporated community in Mahoning County, in the U.S. state of Ohio.

History
A post office called New Buffalo was established in 1877, and remained in operation until 1902. Besides the post office, New Buffalo had a country store.

References

{

Unincorporated communities in Mahoning County, Ohio
1877 establishments in Ohio
Populated places established in 1877
Unincorporated communities in Ohio